Technology is the collection of tools, including machinery, modifications, arrangements and procedures used by humans.

Technology may also refer to:

 Technology (band), a Russian synthpop band
 Technology (Crimson Death album) or the title song, 2004
 Technology (Don Broco album) or the title song, 2018
 "Technology", a song by Chris Brown from Indigo, 2019

See also 

 Tech (disambiguation)
 Technical (disambiguation)